Two Bones is an album by American trombonist Curtis Fuller with fellow trombonist Slide Hampton recorded in 1958. It was not released until the Japanese King Records label issued it in 1980 under license. The session (plus additional alternate takes) was finally released in the U.S. as part of the Mosaic Records box set The Complete Blue Note/UA Curtis Fuller Sessions in 1996.

Track listing
All compositions by Curtis Fuller except as indicated
 "Fuss Budget" - 7:44
 "Oatmeal Cookie" - 4:37
 "Da-Baby" - 7:31
 "Pajama Tops" - 5:35
 "Slide's Ride" (Slide Hampton) - 3:57
 "Loquacious Lady" - 4:09
 "Mean Jean" - 5:40

Personnel
Curtis Fuller, Slide Hampton – trombone
Sonny Clark – piano
George Tucker – bass
Charlie Persip – drums

References 

Blue Note Records albums
Curtis Fuller albums
1980 albums
Albums produced by Alfred Lion
Albums recorded at Van Gelder Studio